Alexander Orr may refer to:

 Alexander D. Orr (1761–1835), American farmer and politician from Maysville, Kentucky
 Alexander Ector Orr (1831–1914), businessman in New York City, influential in the building of the New York City Subway system